Sergey Yefimovich Donskoy ( born 13 October 1968) is a Russian politician, and since May 2012 the Minister of Natural Resources and Environment of Russia.

He was born in Elektrostal. In 1992, he finished his studies in Gubkin Russian State University of Oil and Gas. On May 21, he was appointed to the role of Minister of Natural Resources and Environment of Russia in Dmitry Medvedev's Cabinet.

References

External links

1968 births
Living people
Politics of Russia
Environment ministers
Government ministers of Russia